ProjectLibre is a project management software company with both a free open-source desktop and an upcoming Cloud version.  ProjectLibre Cloud is in beta testing. 

ProjectLibre desktop is a free and open-source project management software system intended ultimately as a standalone replacement for Microsoft Project. ProjectLibre has been downloaded 6,000,000 times in 197 countries on all 7 continents and translated into 29 languages    

The latest release of ProjectLibre was released with extensive update for global users.  ProjectLibre has been translated into 29 languages and has users on all 7 continents.   The 1.9.3 release allows project managers to select the language in a drop down list. In addition to language, the country can be chosen which also sets the project currency and date format. Based on the referenced downloads, languages it is derived that ProjectLibre delivers project management software in native language and currency to over 6,000,000 people worldwide and 197 countries.  

ProjectLibre is written in the Java programming language, and will thus theoretically run on any machine for which a fully functioning Java virtual machine (JVM) exists. Currently, ProjectLibre is certified to run on Linux, MacOS, and Microsoft Windows. It is released under the Common Public Attribution License (CPAL) and qualifies as free software according to the Free Software Foundation.

ProjectLibre's initial release was in August 2012. SourceForge staff selected ProjectLibre ProjectLibre as the January 2016 "Staff Pick" Project of the Month.

ProjectLibre Cloud is a web-based project management application. ProjectLibre Cloud will be a multi-user, multi-project version in the browser. It will be similar to Google Docs compared to Microsoft Word. The beta test timing has not been announced.

History 
The initial release of ProjectLibre occurred in August 2012. 

The team is looking in Winter 2022 to release a Cloud/SaaS version, which will extend the desktop features with team and enterprise features.  It will be a SaaS solution on a subscription.

Features 
The current version includes:
Microsoft Project 2010 compatibility
OpenOffice and LibreOffice compatibility
Ribbon user interface
Earned value costing
Gantt chart
PERT graph only (not PERT technique)
Resource breakdown structure (RBS) chart
Task usage reports
Work breakdown structure (WBS) chart

Comparison to Microsoft Project 
Compared to Microsoft Project, which it closely emulates, ProjectLibre has a similar user interface (UI) including a ribbon-style menu, and a similar approach to construction of a project plan: create an indented task list or work breakdown structure (WBS), set durations, create links (either by (a) mouse drag, (b) selection and then button-down, or (c) manually type in the "predecessor" column), assign resources. The columns (fields) look the same as for Microsoft Project. Costing features are comparable: labour, hourly rate, material usage, and fixed costs: these are all provided.

ProjectLibre improvements 
 Full compatibility with Microsoft Project 2010, import/export capability
 Printing
 PDF exporting (without any restrictions)
 Ribbon user interface
 Many bug fixes and correction of issues that OpenProj encounters that are mentioned above

See also 

 Comparison of project management software
 Microsoft Project
 OpenProj

References

External links 
 
ProjectLibre on SourceForge

Free software programmed in Java (programming language)
Free project management software
Java platform software